The Plymouth School, at 135 S. Main in Plymouth, Utah, was built as a public works project in 1934.  It was listed on the National Register of Historic Places in 1986.

It was built by Elijah Thompson and is Tudor Revival in style.

References

National Register of Historic Places in Box Elder County, Utah
Tudor Revival architecture in the United States
Buildings and structures completed in 1934
1934 establishments in Utah